The Darwin Entertainment Centre is the city's main concert venue and hosts theatre and orchestral performances in Darwin, Australia. The centre is located in the Heart of Darwin's central business district. The Darwin Symphony Orchestra regularly plays there.

American singer Tina Turner performed at the venue in February 1988 as part of her Break Every Rule World Tour.

History
The Darwin Entertainment Centre was built during the 1980s and was Opened by the Administrator of the Northern Territory in 1986. The Darwin Entertainment Centre is the premier entertainment and convention venue in Darwin, Australia. The Darwin Entertainment Centre is located in the city's entertainment district of Mitchell Street.

Building
The Darwin Entertainment Centre houses two theatres including a Playhouse which is a traditional proscenium arch theatre seating more than 1000 people and a Studio Theatre which is a smaller theatre seating more than 290 people. There is also an Exhibition Gallery and Rehearsal Room.

The centre has many performances and has played host to major national and international acts as well as local artists, local Eisteddfod competitions, and school concerts.

References

External links

Music venues in Australia
Indoor arenas in Australia
Tourist attractions in Darwin, Northern Territory
Buildings and structures in Darwin, Northern Territory